Pinola is an unincorporated community in Simpson County, Mississippi, United States. Its zip code is 39149.

Notes

Unincorporated communities in Simpson County, Mississippi
Unincorporated communities in Mississippi